Calculibacillus  is a Gram-positive, non-spore-forming and strictly anaerobic genus of bacteria from the family of Bacillaceae with one known species (Calculibacillus koreensis). Calculibacillus koreensis has been isolated from sediments of a coal mine in Taebaek.

References

Bacillaceae
Bacteria genera
Monotypic bacteria genera
Bacteria described in 2021